5052 may refer to:
The year in the 6th millennium
5052 Nancyruth, asteroid
5052 aluminium alloy